BBC in Concert is a live album by English post-punk band Killing Joke, released in October 1995 by Windsong International Records.

Content 

Tracks 1–10 were recorded at the 1986 Reading Festival in England (on 22 August), while the final three songs were recorded during a 1985 Paris Theatre appearance (on 6 March).

Reception 

It has been reviewed as a "better-than-average bootleg" due to the sound quality.

Track listing 

 "Twilight of the Mortals" – 4:47
 "Chessboards" – 5:36
 "Kings & Queens" – 4:11
 "Darkness Before Dawn" – 5:02
 "Love Like Blood" – 4:44
 "Sanity" – 4:48
 "Love of the Masses" – 4:07
 "Requiem" – 3:19
 "Complications" – 3:20
 "Wardance" – 3:50
 "Tabazan" – 4:34
 "Tension" – 3:50
 "Pssyche" – 5:26

Personnel 
Killing Joke
 Jaz Coleman – vocals
 Kevin "Geordie" Walker – guitar
 Paul Raven – bass guitar
 Paul Ferguson – drums
 Dave Kovacevic – synthesizer

References 

BBC Radio recordings
Killing Joke live albums
1995 live albums